Te Pātū is a Māori iwi from Northland, New Zealand. The iwi is one of the six Muriwhenua iwi of the far north of the North Island. Te Pātū trace their ancestry back to Tuwhakatere, and their arrival in New Zealand to the Kurahaupo canoe.

According to Te Pātū tradition, Pōhurihanga's descendant Tūwhakatere married two women. His first wife was Tūterangi-a-tōhia; their child was Pōpota, who became an important ancestor of Te Pātū. His second wife as Tūpōia; their son was Hoka.

Te Pātū's Treaty of Waitangi settlement has been signed, but not yet legislated.

Te Reo Irirangi o Te Hiku o Te Ika, an iwi radio station, serves Ngāi Takoto and other Muriwhenua tribes of the Far North.

Te Pātū kuia Waireti Walters was a long-serving Māori rights advocate. She campaigned for culturally appropriate cervical screening campaigner and was involved in a Waitangi Tribunal case to recognise Māori rights to flora and fauna. She died in September 2015.

See also
List of Māori iwi
Ngāi Takoto

References